Aleksan Karapetyan (born 17 August 1970 in Gyumri) is an Armenian weightlifter who later represented Australia.

Karapetyan won a silver medal at the 1995 World Weightlifting Championships for his home country Armenia. He competed at the 1996 Summer Olympics representing Armenia, coming in 13th place, and at the 2000 Summer Olympics representing Australia, coming in 10th place. In 2007 Karapetyan was suspended for two years after he admitted benzylpiperazine doping.

Major results
He competed at world championships, most recently at the 2003 World Weightlifting Championships.

References

External links 
 
 
 
 
 
 Aleksander Karapetyan at Lift Up

1970 births
Living people
Sportspeople from Gyumri
Armenian male weightlifters
Australian male weightlifters
Olympic weightlifters of Armenia
Olympic weightlifters of Australia
Weightlifters at the 1996 Summer Olympics
Weightlifters at the 2000 Summer Olympics
Weightlifters at the 2006 Commonwealth Games
Australian people of Armenian descent
Armenian emigrants to Australia
Doping cases in Australian weightlifting
Commonwealth Games gold medallists for Australia
Commonwealth Games medallists in weightlifting
European Weightlifting Championships medalists
World Weightlifting Championships medalists
Medallists at the 2006 Commonwealth Games